The International Festival of Arts “Slavianski Bazaar in Vitebsk”, also known as Slavic Bazaar, is an annual festival held in Vitebsk, Belarus under the auspices of the Belarusian Government since 1992. Its main program is devoted to Slavic music. The main participants are artists from Russia, Belarus, Ukraine, countries of the former Yugoslavia, Poland, and Bulgaria with guests from many other countries, both Slavic and non-Slavic.

History

The predecessor of the festival was "Polish Song Festival in Vitebsk" that was held in Vitebsk.  Vitebsk was chosen to host the festival according to the agreements with Polish city Zielona Góra where "Soviet Song Festival" was held since 1965. The main venue of the present-day festival, the Amphitheatre, was constructed especially for such occasion in 1988.

Only two editions of the "Polish Song Festival in Vitebsk" were held: in 1988 and 1990. After the Dissolution of the Soviet Union the cultural ties between the former Soviet bloc countries have broken. So there emerged an idea to organize a cultural arrangement in order to show the cultural diversity of Slavic nations. The first Slavianski Bazaar was opened in 1992. It was organized by the Belarusian Government with the financial support from Russia and Ukraine. The main goal of the very first festival was an attempt to acquaint the Belarusian audience with pop and folk trends from Slavic countries.

In 1993 the festival became a member of the International Federation of Festival Organizations (FIDOF). 

The festival was awarded the diploma 'FIDOF Festival of the Year 2000' "for impeccable quality of organization, professionalism, hospitality, and promotion of noble humanistic aims on the international level".

The contest

During the festival, a contest for young singers is held. It has two stages, each held on a separate day. On the first day the contestants should perform the song in a national language of the country the contestant represents. All vocals are sung live using backing track. On the second day the contestants perform the song written by a composer from any Slavic country in any of the Slavic languages. On this stage all vocals must be sung live with the National Concert Orchestra of Belarus under Mikhail Finberg's conduction.

Children's contest winners
The children's contest during the festival in Vitebsk was first held in 2003, an expansion of the cultural and artistic diversity of the event. It has become one of the mainstay events in the Eurasian Region ( North Asia, Eastern Europe, Central Asia) for child performers making their way to Junior Eurovision Song Contest.

See also
 Through Art – to Peace and Understanding: an award given each year at the Slavic Bazaar
 History of marketing
 Market (place)
 Retail

References

External links

Slavianski Bazaar website
News of Slavianski Bazaar

Bazaars
Culture in Vitebsk
Music festivals established in 1992
Rock festivals in Belarus
Singing competitions
Music competitions in Belarus
Tourist attractions in Vitebsk Region